Mohamed Al-Qasem (born 1 January 1970) is a Jordanian sport shooter. He competed in the 1996 Summer Olympics.

References

1970 births
Living people
Shooters at the 1996 Summer Olympics
Jordanian male sport shooters
Olympic shooters of Jordan